Edison Reshketa (born 2 June 1999 in Shkoder) is an Albanian basketball player who plays for BC Chilly Mazarin. He previously played for BC Vllaznia as a professional in the Albanian Basketball League, for the Albanian U18 National Basketball Team and also for Albanian U16 National  Basketball Team

Career History 
Clubs:

2015-2017 : BC Vllaznia

2017–Present : BC Chilly Mazarin

National Team:

2015: Albania U16 National Team

2016: Albania U18 National Team

2017: Albania U18 National Team

References 

Albanian men's basketball players
Basketball players from Shkodër
Living people
1999 births
Shooting guards